Minervarya parambikulamana (common names: Parambikulam frog, Parambikulam wart frog) is a species of frog that is endemic to the Western Ghats, India. It is only known from its type locality, "Parambikulam forests", possibly within the Parambikulam Wildlife Sanctuary in Kerala state.

References

parambikulamana
Frogs of India
Endemic fauna of the Western Ghats
Taxa named by C. R. Narayan Rao
Amphibians described in 1937
Taxobox binomials not recognized by IUCN